Thy Messenger is an extended play by the Polish death metal band Vader. The EP was released 31 May 2019 through Nuclear Blast.

Track listing 
All tracks written by Vader except Steeler, written by Tipton, Halford, and Downing.

Reception 
Writing for Metal Injection, Matthew Castleman wrote, "Vader still loves being Vader," and rated the EP an 8 out of 10. Metal Report called the release "merciless" and rated it an 8.5 out of 10. Writing for Metal Temple, Ross Donald called the EP "almost perfect", rating it a 9 out of 10.

Lineup 

 Piotr Wiwczarek – lead guitar, vocals
 Marek Pajak – rhythm guitar
 Tomasz Halicki – bass
 James Stewart – drums

Charts

References 

2019 albums
Death metal EPs
Vader (band) albums